Igor Aleksandrovich Volkov (born 23 August 1971) is a former Uzbekistani football player.

External links
 

1971 births
Living people
Place of birth missing (living people)
Soviet footballers
Uzbekistani footballers
Uzbekistani expatriate footballers
Expatriate footballers in Russia
Expatriate footballers in Belarus
Russian Premier League players
FC Nasaf players
Pakhtakor Tashkent FK players
FK Neftchi Farg'ona players
FC Torpedo Moscow players
FC Torpedo-2 players
FC Yenisey Krasnoyarsk players
FC Dynamo Stavropol players
FC Dnepr Mogilev players
Association football midfielders
Uzbekistani expatriate sportspeople in Belarus
Uzbekistani expatriate sportspeople in Russia